Frog legs (French: Cuisses de grenouille)  are one of the better-known delicacies of French cuisine, where it has been considered a national delicacy.

The legs of edible frogs are also consumed in other parts of the world, including Vietnam, Southern China, Cambodia, Thailand, Indonesia, Korea, Northern Italy, the Alentejo region of Portugal, Spain, Albania, Slovenia, Romania, Bulgaria, Northwestern Greece, South Africa and the Southern regions of the United States. 

As of 2014, the world's largest exporter of edible frogs is Indonesia, second is China, third is Turkey. In Turkey, Brazil, Mexico and the Caribbean, many frogs are still caught wild. Balıkesir, Adana, Edirne and Hatay are the popular Turkish cities for edible wild frogs.

Frog legs are rich in protein, omega-3 fatty acids, vitamin A, and potassium. They are often said to taste like chicken because of their mild flavor, with a texture most similar to chicken wings. The taste and texture of frog meat is approximately between chicken and fish. Frogs are raised commercially in certain countries, including Vietnam. Frog muscles do not resolve rigor mortis as quickly as muscles from warm-blooded animals (chicken, for example) do, so heat from cooking can cause fresh frog legs to twitch.

In world cuisines

France

Frog legs or cuisses de grenouille as it is known in France are a traditional dish particularly found in the region of the Dombes (département of Ain). Eaten for over a thousand years, they have been part of the national diet of France. Roughly 4,000 tonnes of frog legs are consumed every year in France.

China
Frog, known as「田鸡」(field chicken) when described in cuisine, legs are also eaten in China, but are generally restricted to Southern Chinese cuisine tradition such as Cantonese cuisine. Bullfrogs and pig frogs are farmed on a large scale in some areas of China, such as Sichuan.

In Chinese cuisine, frog legs are usually stir-fried and mixed with light spices, stewed, fried, or made into congee.

Indonesia

In Indonesian cuisine, frog-leg soup is known as swikee or swike, most probably brought by the Chinese community in Indonesia and popular in Chinese Indonesian cuisine. Swikee is mainly frog-leg soup with a strong taste of garlic, gingers, and fermented soya beans (tauco), accompanied with celery or parsley leaves. Swikee is a typical dish from Purwodadi Grobogan, in Central Java province. There are also frog-legs fried in margarine and sweet soy sauce or tomato sauce, battered and deep fried, grilled, or frog eggs served in banana leaves (pepes telur kodok). The dried and crispy fried frog skin is also consumed as krupuk cracker, the taste is similar to fried fish skin.

Indonesia is the world's largest exporter of frog meat, exporting more than 5,000 tonnes of frog meat each year, mostly to France, Belgium and Luxembourg. Most supply of frog legs in western Europe originate from frog farms in Indonesia; however, there is concern that frog legs from Indonesia are poached from wild frog populations that may be endangering wild amphibians.

Italy

Frogs are a common food in the northern part of Italy, especially throughout Piemonte and Lombardy and within these two regions especially in the Vercelli area in Piemonte and in the Pavia and Lomellina areas in Lombardy. In these  places frogs are part of the ancient culinary tradition and a typical staple food. Consumption of frogs is mainly related to the availability of the animals due to the rural activities and typical agriculture in these places.

The large presence of frogs is mainly due to the agriculture typical of these areas which have always been known for their famous rice. The large cultivation of rice means that there is large presence of artificial water channels used to flood rice fields during growing season, which makes a perfect habitat for frogs. During the growth period when fields stay flooded, and even more during the draining of the fields farmers and others often gather to go frog hunting armed with nets. Some towns even organize collective hunting sessions and games.

Frogs gained much culinary relevance in these areas, with many rural towns hosting food festivals called sagre centered on frogs and where frogs are prepared in various ways. They typically take place during the rice harvesting periods. With frog consumption closely connected to rice production and this being the native land of the Italian dish risotto, one of the most common dishes is frog risotto, risotto alle rane. Other local frog dishes include them being dipped in egg batter, breadcrumbed and then fried, or in soups and stews.

Slovenia

Frog legs (žabji kraki) are a popular dish in Slovenian cuisine, especially in areas of eastern Slovenia (Prekmurje and north-eastern Styria).They are also quite popular in the country's capital, Ljubljana, and have been considered as the "basis of the traditional city cuisine of Ljubljana". Up to modern times, they have been traditionally considered Lent food, and were especially popular in spring. They are also a popular traditional dish in the Vipava Valley in western Slovenia and are served in numerous restaurants in the Slovenian Littoral.

Croatia
Frog legs are popular in some parts of Croatia, especially in the Gorski kotar region in the northwest of the country. They are considered a specialty in the Lokve municipality, where they are served cooked, fried or in a stew, sometimes with polenta on the side.

Spain
In the western part of Spain, Extremadura and Castilla y Leon, frog legs are served deep fried. They are a delicacy among its citizens. Frog legs also have great culinary value on the sides of the Ebro.

Albania

In Albania, frog legs are regarded as a very delicious food. Frogs are mostly collected from the wild.

Greece
In Greece, eating frogs' legs is particularly associated with the city of Ioannina and its adjacent lake Pamvotida.

Romania
In Romania, edible frogs are known as pui de baltă (pond chicken). The legs are eaten breaded and fried.

United States

Frog legs are eaten in parts of the Southern United States, particularly in the Deep South and Gulf states where French influence is more prominent, including South Carolina, Georgia, Florida, Alabama, Mississippi, and Louisiana. They are also eaten in Eastern states, but not as commonly. Frog legs are a popular dish in Cleveland, Ohio, especially in its Little Italy and Asiatown neighborhoods. The most common kinds of frogs eaten are bullfrogs and leopard frogs, as these are abundant in most of the country, including the South. Although the consumption of wild native frogs is generally discouraged, the harvest and cooking of invasive bullfrogs, especially in the Western US, has been encouraged as a form of control and to promote local cuisine.

Some methods of cooking include egg/cracker crumb breading or battered. They are either fried or grilled. Deep fried frog legs can also be found at fairs.

Raccoon, possum, partridges, prairie hen, and frogs were among the fare Mark Twain recorded as part of American cuisine.

Caribbean
Mountain chicken (Leptodactylus fallax) are frogs named for their habitat and flavor which are eaten in Montserrat and Dominica. The frogs are now critically endangered.

United Kingdom
Cooked bones of frog legs have been discovered in an archaeological dig in Amesbury Wiltshire, dating back to between 7596 and 6250 BC, evidence that indicates that they were part of the local diet. Some view this as evidence that Britons started eating them before the French. For several centuries however, frogs have been considered repellent to the British due to their historic rivalry with the French. "Frog" has been an abusive English nickname for a French person since the late 18th century. In the late 19th century, the French restaurateur, Auguste Escoffier, tried to rename them "nymphs" in a vain attempt to sell them to London diners. In recent decades, adventurous British chefs have introduced frog leg dishes to their menus, notably Heston Blumenthal whose recipes have included frog blancmange.

Australia, New Zealand and Canada
In Australia and New Zealand, frogs are more exotic, usually eaten at Asian or French restaurants and mainly the hind legs are the priority. In Canada, they are a little more common, mainly in eastern and northeastern Canada.

Issues

Trade
Each year about US$40 million worth of frog legs are traded internationally, with most countries in the world participating in this trade.  The world's top importers of frogs legs are France, Belgium and the United States, while the biggest international exporters are Indonesia and China. While these figures do not account for domestic consumption, when production from frog farms is taken into account, it is conservatively estimated that humans consume up to 3.2 billion frogs for food around the world every year.

Health
Movement of live or unfrozen, unskinned amphibians is a potential way for deadly amphibian diseases such as Batrachochytrium dendrobatidis and Ranavirus to be transported around the world, and despite recommendations on preventing disease spread from the OIE, which regulates the international spread of epizootic diseases, few countries have adopted these recommendations as law.

In Canada, the sale of fresh or frozen frog legs is illegal unless they are determined free from bacteria of the genus Salmonella, as per the official method MFO-10, Microbial Examination of Froglegs.

Environment and animal welfare

Many environmentalists urge the restriction of frog consumption—especially those harvested from the wild—because amphibian populations are declining and frogs are an essential element of ecosystems. Conservationists warn that gastronomic demand for frogs is seriously depleting regional populations. Frogs are sensitive to environmental changes, disease, habitat degradation, and pollution.

The exception to this is where the American bullfrog is not native and has been introduced.  In these ecosystems, American bullfrogs can decimate local amphibian populations, upset ecosystem balance and have negative impacts on other species of wildlife as well.

A 2011 paper raised animal welfare concerns over methods such as live removal of legs and methods of hunting, recommending that countries of origin "establish humane standards to govern the capture, handling, packaging and export of live frogs and for the capture,
handling, killing and processing of frogs used for food to minimize animal suffering".

Religious
According to Jewish dietary laws all reptiles and amphibians are considered unclean animals.  Therefore, frog legs are not kosher, and are forbidden to observant Jews in Orthodox Judaism. However, more liberal streams of Judaism such as Reform, do not prohibit the eating of non-kosher animals.  Traditional Judaism also includes universal laws that define which activities are considered to be sinful even for non-Jews according to Jewish law, known as the Noahide laws.  Under this rubric, there is a prohibition against eating limbs taken from live animals, known as eiver min hachai, thus Jewish law would consider it to be sinful for any person to eat frogs legs that were removed from live frogs.  This is also considered to be under the prohibition of cruelty to animals, which liberal Jewish streams accept as forbidden just as traditional Judaism considers to be forbidden.

Frog meat is considered as haraam (non-halal) according to some Islamic dietary laws. Those who consider it haraam cite the hadith that prohibits the killing of frogs, together with ants, bees, and seabirds. This haraam status has caused controversy in Demak, Indonesia, where the authorities urged the swikee (frog leg soup) restaurant owners not to associate swikee with Demak city, since it would tarnish Demak's image as the first Islamic city in Java, and also opposed by its inhabitants that mainly follow Shafi'i school that forbids the consumption of frogs. Within Islamic dietary law there are some debates and differences about the consumption of frog legs. The Islamic madhhab (school) of Shafi'i, Hanafi and Hanbali strictly forbids the consumption of frogs, but according to the Maliki school, opinions vary, between the consumptions of all frogs being halal to only the green frog commonly found in rice fields being halal to consume, while other species, especially those with blistered skin, are considered to be unclean.

In medieval and early modern Europe, frogs were not classified as meat and could therefore be eaten during the Christian fast of Lent, along with fish and bird flesh. Monks in Lorraine were recorded as eating frogs during Lent in the 13th century. The famous French chef, Grimod de La Reynière, wrote in the early 19th century that frogs were known as Alouettes de Carême (Lenten larks).

References

External links

Frogs
French cuisine
Cantonese cuisine
Lenten foods
Frogs in culture
Cajun cuisine
Cuisine of the Southern United States
Soul food
Romanian cuisine
Caribbean cuisine